Fernando Lorefice (born May 12, 1983) is an Argentine footballer who plays for Club Atlético Ituzaingó.

Career

Lorefice began his playing career with Independiente where he played 31 games in the Primera División Argentina. He has also played for Maccabi Haifa of Israel, Morelia "B" of Mexico, Skoda Xanthi of Greece, Defensa y Justicia and his current club Atlanta of the Argentine 2nd division.

References

External links
 
 
 Fernando Lorefice – Argentine Primera statistics at Fútbol XXI 
 

1983 births
Argentine footballers
Argentine expatriate footballers
Living people
Club Atlético Independiente footballers
Defensa y Justicia footballers
Maccabi Haifa F.C. players
Xanthi F.C. players
Deportivo Merlo footballers
Club Atlético Los Andes footballers
Club Atlético Platense footballers
CSyD Tristán Suárez footballers
Club Atlético Ituzaingó players
Argentine Primera División players
Primera Nacional players
Primera B Metropolitana players
Super League Greece players
Argentine expatriate sportspeople in Israel
Argentine expatriate sportspeople in Greece
Argentine expatriate sportspeople in Mexico
Expatriate footballers in Israel
Expatriate footballers in Greece
Expatriate footballers in Mexico
People from Quilmes
Association football midfielders
Sportspeople from Buenos Aires Province